José Ocejo (born 2 February 1928, died before 2016) was a Spanish sailor. He competed in the Star event at the 1960 Summer Olympics.

References

External links
 

1928 births
Year of death missing
Spanish male sailors (sport)
Olympic sailors of Spain
Sailors at the 1960 Summer Olympics – Star
People from the Bay of Santander
Sailors (sport) from Cantabria